Aguas Buenas,, popularly known as "La Ciudad de las Aguas Claras" or "The City of Clear Waters", is a town and municipality of Puerto Rico located in the Central Mountain Range, north of Cidra, south of Bayamón, Guaynabo and San Juan; east of Comerio; and north-west of Caguas. Aguas Buenas is spread over 9 barrios and Aguas Buenas Pueblo (the downtown area and the administrative center of the city). It is part of the San Juan-Caguas-Guaynabo Metropolitan Statistical Area.

Etymology and nicknames 
The name Aguas Buenas translates to "good waters". The town's and municipality's original names were Aguabuena ("good water"), originally a barrio or district of Caguas, and Aguas Claras ("clear waters"). These names and some of the municipality's nicknames such as Ciudad de las Aguas Claras ("city of clear waters") and Oasis de Puerto Rico ("Puerto Rico's oasis") are a reference to the number of natural water springs that can be found in the municipality, particularly those founds around the Aguas Buenas Cave and Caverns System Nature Reserve (Spanish: Reserva Natural Sistema de Cuevas y Cavernas de Aguas Buenas). In addition to aguasbonenses, citizens and residents of Aguas Buenas are often referred to as Mulos ("mules") or Ñocos ("amputees").

History 
Aguas Buenas was originally a sector of Caguas known as Aguabuena. In 1798, a group of residents started establishing their houses near some of the rivers in the area and started calling the sector Aguas Claras.

The quantity of residents incremented with time and on July 25, 1832, they organized a meeting and commissioned Francisco de Salas Torres and Ramón Díaz to do the necessary arrangements for the region to be declared a municipality. A resident, Julian López, offered part of his estate to be used for the construction of a town square, a church, the city hall, and the priest house.

The town was officially founded on May 25, 1838, and the name was changed to Aguas Buenas. Francisco de Salas Torres was declared the first mayor. Initially, the economy of the town relied on coffee plantations and commerce. At the end of the 19th century, the town's population was close to 7,000.

In 1906, mayor Don José E. Morales bought nearly six acres of terrain from Don Guillermo Díaz Delgado. In these lands, the sectors of La Pajilla, El Pueblito and El Guanábano were established, expanding the town's area.

The epicenter of the 2010 Aguas Buenas earthquake, popularly known as the Nochebuena Earthquake, was centered between the barrios Juan Asencio, Mulita and Sonadora.

Hurricane Maria on September 20, 2017, triggered numerous landslides in Aguas Buenas with the significant amount of rainfall. Between1,000 and 3,000 homes in Aguas Buenas were destroyed or suffered significant damage as a result of the hurricane. A year after the hurricane struck, many older residents refused to leave their damaged homes and continued to live in their homes, without a reconstructed roof, but with a blue tarp for a roof. The hurricane winds and rain damaged infrastructure and caused the entire electrical system to collapse.

Geography 
The terrain is moderately mountainous located in the northern edge of the Cayey mountain range (Sierra de Cayey), part of the Cordillera Central in Puerto Rico. The highest peaks are La Peña, Santa Bárbara, La Tisa, and La Marquesa.

Water features 
Several rivers flow through Aguas Buenas. Some of them are the Bayamón River, and several small rivers that are part of the Río Grande de Loíza, like Bairoa, Caguitas, and Cañas.

Barrios

Like all municipalities of Puerto Rico, Aguas Buenas is subdivided into barrios.
Aguas Buenas barrio-pueblo
 Bairoa
 Bayamoncito
 Cagüitas
 Jagüeyes
 Juan Asencio
 Mula
 Mulita
 Sonadora
 Sumidero

Sectors
Barrios (which are like minor civil divisions) and subbarrios, in turn, are further subdivided into smaller local populated place areas/units called sectores (sectors in English). The types of sectores may vary, from normally sector to urbanización to reparto to barriada to residencial, among others.

Special Communities

 (Special Communities of Puerto Rico) are marginalized communities whose citizens are experiencing a certain amount of social exclusion. A map shows these communities occur in nearly every municipality of the commonwealth. Of the 742 places that were on the list in 2014, the following barrios, communities, sectors, or neighborhoods were in Aguas Buenas: Vázquez neighborhood, Las Parcelas in Bayamoncito barrio, Sonadora barrio, Cagüitas Centro, Pajilla sector in Centro Urbano, Jagüeyes Abajo, Las Corujas, and Parcelas Santa Clara in Sumidero barrio.

Tourism 
Some of the landmarks and places of interest in Aguas Buenas are located in its town square. Places of interest in Aguas Buenas include:
 Finca Artesanal 
 La Charca Recreational Center
 Aguas Buenas Caves
 El Mirador Walkway
 Luis A. Ferré Plaza (main square of the downtown area)
 City Hall
 Lecture House
 Christ Redeemer House
 Jagüeyes Country Club
 Monte La Tiza
 Maximiliano Merced fire station
 Juan Nieves Cotto baseball park
 Holy Spirit parish

To stimulate local tourism during the COVID-19 pandemic in Puerto Rico, the Puerto Rico Tourism Company launched the Voy Turistiendo (I'm Touring) campaign in 2021. The campaign featured a passport book with a page for each municipality.

Culture

Sports 
Aguas Buenas has an amateur baseball team called .

Festivals and events 
Aguas Buenas celebrates its patron saint festival in September. The  is a religious and cultural celebration that generally features parades, games, artisans, amusement rides, regional food, and live entertainment.

Other festivals and events celebrated in Aguas Buenas include the Salsa, Bomba & Plena Festival held in late summer, an Agricultural festival held in May and the  held in January. An annual Carnival is held in March.

Economy 
After its foundation, the economy of Aguas Buenas relied mostly on coffee plantations.

Demographics 

According to the 2020 census, Aguas Buenas has a population of 24,223. This represents a decline of 15.5% or over 4,000 inhabitants in comparison to the 2010 census.

According to the 2010 Census, 72.5% of the population identifies themselves as White, and 12.6% as African-American. Also, according to the census, the population is equally divided by gender (49% are males, while 51% are females). Finally, 25% of the population is under 18 years old. The next biggest percentage of population (19.4%) is between 35 and 49 years old.

Government 

All municipalities in Puerto Rico are administered by a mayor, elected every four years. The current mayor of Aguas Buenas is Javier García Pérez, of the New Progressive Party (PNP). He was elected at the 2016 general elections. However, on May 5, 2022, García Pérez was arrested by the FBI on corruption, bribery, and extortion charges. and was subsequently removed from his position.

Since 2011, the city belongs to the Puerto Rico Senatorial district I, which is represented by two Senators. In 2012, José Nadal Power and Ramón Luis Nieves were elected as District Senators.

Mayors
The following have been the Mayors of the Aguas Buenas Municipality, from its foundation to the present:

Symbols 
The  has an official flag and coat of arms.

Flag 
The flag of Aguas Buenas features a blue triangle with the base at the hoist. The triangle has a solitary white star, like the national banner. A second triangle appears interposed with the first one, in yellow, with its point reaching the other end of the flag. The main field of the flag, under both triangles, is color green.

Coat of arms 
Designed by Francisco Diaz Rivera in 1975, the coat of arms features a four-paneled shield. The upper left panel shows the Virgin of Monserrate, while the upper right panel features a Taíno, a symbol of the original inhabitants of this region. At the bottom right panel, lies a cornucopia containing the native fruit of Aguas Buenas. This panel represents how the agriculture was the primary source of income for the town. In the lower left panel, there are four maracas and a güicharo, typical instruments of the "jibaros" of Aguas Buenas and Puerto Rico. The crown, as with other municipalities of Puerto Rico, consists of three towers.

Anthem 
Bajo el azul del cielo de mi patria

En el oriente de la Cordillera

Aguasbonenses forjando la historia

Defendiendo el honor de su bandera.

De sol a sol sembrando nuestros frutos

El orgullo labrado en nuestra tierra

La siega de un futuro va anunciando

El brillo de la solitaria estrella.

Que se levanta en medio del combate

Por negarse a ser solo una quimera

Raices firmes que en el pecho laten

Afirmando la patria y la conciencia.

Aguas Buenas, estirpe de valientes

Pedazo del terruño borinqueño

Un pueblo que se une en la conquista

De lo que es ser un buen puertoriqueñio.

Yo soy Aguas Buenas!

Transportation 
To reach the town of Aguas Buenas, visitors must take the Puerto Rico Highway 52 to the city of Caguas. From there, PR-156 leads directly into the downtown square. Other minor roads lead to nearby towns such as Comerío.

There are 13 bridges in Aguas Buenas.

Education 
There are around 14 public schools in Aguas Buenas. As with all other municipalities, education is handled by the Puerto Rico Department of Education. These are divided as follows:

Elementary Schools
Dr. Gustavo Muñoz Díaz
Ezequiel Ramos La Santa
Jagüeyes Abajo
José R. González
Luis Santaella
Luis T. Baliñas
Mulitas Alvelo
Ramón Luis Rivera/Juan Asencio
Santa Clara

Junior High Schools
Dr. Pedro Albizu Campos
Luis Muñoz Marín
Su Bayamoncito
Su Sumidero

High Schools
Josefa Pastrana

Notable people
Victor Hernández Cruz – Poet 
Gustavo Muñoz Díaz – Dramatist
Jacobo Córdova Chirino (1901–1955) – Journalist & Humorist
José Arsenio Torres – Professor
Luis Rechani Agrait (1902–1997) – Dramatist
Pio Rechani – Journalist
Rafael Nicolau – Journalist
Josefa Pastrana Lopez (1899–1958) – Professor
Joyce Giraud – Actress and Miss Puerto Rico 1998

See also

List of Puerto Ricans
History of Puerto Rico

References

External links 
Aguas Buenas Municipality on Facebook

Municipalities of Puerto Rico
Populated places established in 1798
San Juan–Caguas–Guaynabo metropolitan area
1838 establishments in the Spanish Empire